HMS Milford was a 32-gun fifth rate built under contract by William Hubbard of Ipswich in 1694/95.

She was the second vessel to carry the name Milford since it was used for a 32-gun fifth rate built at Woolwich Dockyard on 30 March 1690 and captured by the French in the North Sea in November 1693.

Construction and Specifications
She was ordered on 17 May 1694 to be built under contract by William Hubbard of Ipswich. She was launched on 6 March 1695. Her builder’s measure tonnage was calculated as 386 tons (burthen).

The gun armament initially was four demi-culverins on the lower deck (LD) with two pair of guns per side. The upper deck (UD) battery would consist of between twenty and twenty-two 6-pounder guns with ten or eleven guns per side. The gun battery would be completed by four 4-pounder guns on the quarterdeck (QD) with two to three guns per side.

Commissioned Service 1895-1697
HMS Milford was commissioned in 1695 under the command of Captain Thomas Lyell for service in the North Sea on Fishery protection.

Loss
She was taken by five French ships while on passage from Greater Yarmouth to Holland on 7 January 1697. She was incorporated into French Service as the Milfort until 1720.

Notes

Citations

References

 Winfield (2009), British Warships in the Age of Sail (1603 – 1714), by Rif Winfield, published by Seaforth Publishing, England © 2009, EPUB 
 Colledge (2020), Ships of the Royal Navy, by J.J. Colledge, revised and updated by Lt Cdr Ben Warlow and Steve Bush, published by Seaforth Publishing, Barnsley, Great Britain, © 2020, EPUB 
 Lavery (1989), The Arming and Fitting of English Ships of War 1600 - 1815, by Brian Lavery, published by US Naval Institute Press © Brian Lavery 1989, Part V Guns, Type of Guns
 Clowes (1898), The Royal Navy, A History from the Earliest Times to the Present (Vol. II). London. England: Sampson Low, Marston & Company, © 1898

 

1690s ships
Frigates of the Royal Navy
Individual sailing vessels
Ships built in Ipswich
Ships of the Royal Navy